Main page: List of Canadian plants by family

Families:
A | B | C | D | E | F | G | H | I J K | L | M | N | O | P Q | R | S | T | U V W | X Y Z

Haemodoraceae 

 Lachananthes caroliniana — Carolina redroot

Haloragaceae 

 Myriophyllum alterniflorum — alternate-flowered water-milfoil
 Myriophyllum farwellii — Farwell's water-milfoil
 Myriophyllum heterophyllum — broadleaf water-milfoil
 Myriophyllum hippuroides — western water-milfoil
 Myriophyllum humile — low water-milfoil
 Myriophyllum pinnatum — cutleaf water-milfoil
 Myriophyllum quitense — Andean water-milfoil
 Myriophyllum sibiricum — common water-milfoil
 Myriophyllum tenellum — slender water-milfoil
 Myriophyllum ussuriense — Asian water-milfoil
 Myriophyllum verticillatum — whorled water-milfoil
 Proserpinaca intermedia — intermediate mermaidweed
 Proserpinaca palustris — marsh mermaidweed
 Proserpinaca pectinata — combleaf mermaidweed

Hamamelidaceae 

 Hamamelis virginiana — American witch-hazel

Hedwigiaceae 

 Hedwigia ciliata — Hedwig's fringeleaf moss
 Hedwigia stellata
 Pseudobraunia californica

Helodiaceae 

 Helodium blandowii
 Helodium paludosum

Herbertaceae 

 Herbertus hawaiiensis

Hippocastanaceae 

 Aesculus glabra — Ohio buckeye

Hippuridaceae 

 Hippuris montana — mountain mare's-tail
 Hippuris tetraphylla — four-leaf mare's-tail
 Hippuris vulgaris — common mare's-tail

Hookeriaceae 

 Hookeria acutifolia
 Hookeria lucens

Hydrangeaceae 

 Philadelphus lewisii — Lewis' mock-orange
 Philadelphus trichothecus — Columbian mock-orange

Hydrocharitaceae 

 Elodea bifoliata — two-leaf waterweed
 Elodea canadensis — broad waterweed
 Elodea nuttallii — Nuttall's waterweed
 Vallisneria americana — eel-grass

Hydrophyllaceae 

 Ellisia nyctelea — nyctelea
 Hesperochiron pumilus — dwarf hesperochiron
 Hydrophyllum appendiculatum — appendage waterleaf
 Hydrophyllum canadense — bluntleaf waterleaf
 Hydrophyllum capitatum — dwarf waterleaf
 Hydrophyllum fendleri — Fendler's waterleaf
 Hydrophyllum tenuipes — Pacific waterleaf
 Hydrophyllum virginianum — John's-cabbage
 Nemophila breviflora — Great Basin nemophila
 Nemophila parviflora — smallflower nemophila
 Nemophila pedunculata — meadow baby-blue-eyes
 Phacelia franklinii — Franklin's phacelia
 Phacelia hastata — silverleaf scorpion-weed
 Phacelia leptosepala — narrowsepal scorpion-weed
 Phacelia linearis — linearleaf scorpion-weed
 Phacelia lyallii — Lyall's phacelia
 Phacelia mollis — Coffee Creek scorpion-weed
 Phacelia purshii — Miami-mist
 Phacelia ramosissima — branching scorpion-weed
 Phacelia sericea — silky scorpion-weed
 Romanzoffia sitchensis — Sitka mistmaid
 Romanzoffia tracyi — Tracy's mistmaid

Hylocomiaceae 

 Hylocomiastrum pyrenaicum
 Hylocomiastrum umbratum
 Hylocomium splendens — stairstep moss
 Loeskeobryum brevirostre
 Rhytidiadelphus loreus
 Rhytidiadelphus squarrosus
 Rhytidiadelphus triquetrus — shaggy moss
 Rhytidiopsis robusta — pipecleaner moss

Hymenophyllaceae 

 Hymenophyllum wrightii — Wright's filmy fern

Hypnaceae 

 Callicladium haldanianum
 Ctenidium malacodes
 Ctenidium molluscum
 Ctenidium schofieldii
 Gollania turgens
 Herzogiella adscendens
 Herzogiella seligeri
 Herzogiella striatella
 Herzogiella turfacea
 Homomallium adnatum
 Hypnum bambergeri
 Hypnum callichroum
 Hypnum circinale
 Hypnum cupressiforme
 Hypnum curvifolium
 Hypnum dieckii
 Hypnum fertile
 Hypnum hamulosum
 Hypnum holmenii
 Hypnum imponens — hypnum moss
 Hypnum jutlandicum
 Hypnum lindbergii — Lindberg's hypnum moss
 Hypnum mammillatum
 Hypnum pallescens
 Hypnum plicatulum
 Hypnum pratense
 Hypnum procerrimum
 Hypnum recurvatum
 Hypnum revolutum — revolute hypnum moss
 Hypnum subimponens
 Hypnum vaucheri
 Isopterygiopsis muelleriana
 Isopterygiopsis pulchella
 Isopterygium tenerum
 Orthothecium chryseum
 Orthothecium intricatum
 Orthothecium strictum
 Platydictya confervoides — algæ-like matted-moss
 Platydictya jungermannioides
 Platydictya minutissima
 Platydictya subtilis
 Platygyrium repens
 Pseudotaxiphyllum distichaceum — pseudotaxiphyllum moss
 Pseudotaxiphyllum elegans
 Ptilium crista-castrensis — knight's plume
 Pylaisiella intricata
 Pylaisiella polyantha
 Pylaisiella selwynii
 Taxiphyllum deplanatum
 Taxiphyllum taxirameum
 Tripterocladium leucocladulum

Hypopterygiaceae 

 Hypopterygium fauriei

Canada,family,H